The Leader of the Opposition is the politician in the politics of Thailand who leads the main minority party in the House of Representatives. The Leader of the Opposition is the leader of the largest political party in the House of Representatives that is not in government.

Following the Westminster style parliamentary system, Thailand has had an official Leader of the Opposition since 1975. Under the 2007 Constitution the Leader of the Opposition was given an official role within the Thai political system. The constitution stipulates that the Leader of the Opposition must be selected after the Prime Minister and the Cabinet has taken office.

To be nominated as candidate one must be the leader of the largest political party with no member holding any ministerial positions and if his or her party holds more or one-fifth (96 seats) of the seats in the House (480 seats). If no candidate meets this qualification then a leader of a minority party with the largest number of votes from parties with no members holding ministerial positions will be selected. The appointment will then be formalized by the King.

The Leader of the Opposition also has other roles apart from leading the Shadow Cabinet, he is also an ex-officio member of several selection committees for: Constitutional Court Judges, Election Commissioners, Ombudsmen and commissioners of the National Anti-Corruption Commission and members of the State Audit Commission.

List of Opposition leaders

See also
Prime Minister of Thailand
Shadow Cabinet of Thailand
List of political parties in Thailand
House of Representatives (Thailand)

References

External links 
สภาผู้แทนราษฎร :: ทำเนียบผู้นำฝ่ายค้าน

Government of Thailand
Political history of Thailand
Lists of Thai politicians
Thailand